Al Fida – Mers Sultan is a district of Casablanca, in the Casablanca-Settat region of Morocco. The district covers an area of 17.9 square kilometres (6.9 square miles) and as of 2004 had 332,682 inhabitants.

Subdivisions
The district is divided into two arrondissements and one municipality:
 Mers sultan Maarif, containing the municipality of Maarif, Casablanca|

References

Districts of Casablanca